James Allison (1858 – after 1919) was a member of the Wisconsin State Assembly in 1912–13.

Biography
Allison was born on July 25, 1858 to Mary Crockett and William Allison on a farm in Maxville, Wisconsin that he would later own. In 1880, his father was also a member of the Wisconsin State Assembly. Allison attended high school in Durand, Wisconsin. In addition to farming, he was a Sunday school superintendent, teacher and conducted a creamery.

On January 30, 1889, Allison married Florence Mace (1864–1921), a school teacher originally from Clinton county, New York, with whom he raised three sons. One of them, Robert M., would become Clerk of Maxville. Like his parents, Allison and his wife are interred in Maxville.

Political career
Allison was a member of the Assembly during the 1913 session. Other positions he held include school board member. He was a Republican.

References

1858 births
Year of death missing
People from Buffalo County, Wisconsin
Republican Party members of the Wisconsin State Assembly
School board members in Wisconsin
Farmers from Wisconsin
Schoolteachers from Wisconsin
Leaders of the American Society of Equity